Christopher Lamar Ward (born December 16, 1955) is a former American football offensive tackle in the National Football League for the New York Jets and New Orleans Saints. He played college football at Ohio State University.

1956 births
Living people
All-American college football players
Players of American football from Cleveland
American football offensive tackles
Ohio State Buckeyes football players
New York Jets players
New Orleans Saints players